Durant is a ghost town in Angelina County, in the U.S. state of Texas. It is located within the Lufkin, Texas micropolitan area.

History
Durant was the last sawmill community established on the St. Louis Southwestern Railway when it was known as the Cotton Belt rail line. Louis C. Odum built the mill in this area in 1909, thus giving it the name Odum's Town not only because he was the owner of the mill, but also because he was a county commissioner and the community's first postmaster. The post office was established there in 1909 and remained in operation until 1915. Its name was changed to Durant for the Durant Lumber Company, which operated a mill in the area. Durant served as a shipping point for lumber and farm goods during the same time the post office operated. The mill was sold to Arch Carraway, who then moved it to an area near Durant from Nacogdoches County. It shut down when they ran out of lumber in the area, causing the community to decline. It had 5 residents in 1910, which then grew to 25 from 1920 to 1965. It only had one business in 1945. It became a ghost town and an abandoned railroad station by the late 1980s.

Geography

Education
Today, the ghost town is located within the Central Independent School District.

See also
List of ghost towns in Texas

References

Geography of Angelina County, Texas
Ghost towns in East Texas